Dodgson's method is an electoral system proposed by the author, mathematician and logician Charles Dodgson, better known as Lewis Carroll. The method is to extend the Condorcet method by swapping candidates until a Condorcet winner is found. The winner is the candidate which requires the minimum number of swaps. Dodgson proposed this voting scheme in his 1876 work "A method of taking votes on more than two issues". Given an integer k and an election, it is NP-complete to determine whether a candidate can become a Condorcet winner with fewer than k swaps.

Description
In Dodgson's method, each voter submits an ordered list of all candidates according to their own preference (from best to worst). The winner is defined to be the candidate for whom we need to perform the minimum number of pairwise swaps in each ballot (added over all candidates) before they become a Condorcet winner. In particular, if there is already a Condorcet winner, they win the election.

In short, we must find the voting profile with minimum Kendall tau distance from the input, such that it has a Condorcet winner; then, the Condorcet winner is declared the victor. Computing the winner or even the Dodgson score of a candidate (the number of swaps needed to make that candidate a winner) is an NP-hard problem by reduction from Exact Cover by 3-Sets (X3C).

References

Electoral systems
Non-monotonic Condorcet methods
Lewis Carroll